Tukey's test is either:

 Tukey's range test, also called Tukey method, Tukey's honest significance test, Tukey's HSD (Honestly Significant Difference) test
 Tukey's test of additivity